Jean Chabot (October 15, 1806 – May 31, 1860) was a lawyer, judge and political figure in Canada East.

He was born in Saint-Charles near Lévis in 1806 and studied at the Petit Séminaire de Québec. He articled in law with Elzéar Bédard and was called to the bar in 1834. He was elected to the Legislative Assembly of the Province of Canada for Quebec City in a by-election in 1843 and was reelected in 1844 and 1848. He was a supporter of Louis Hippolyte LaFontaine. Chabot helped establish the Society of Saint Vincent de Paul of Quebec and served as chairman of the Quebec conference and president of the Quebec council. He served as commissioner of public works from 1849 to 1850, when he was forced to resign after being arrested while drunk in Toronto. In 1851, he was elected in Bellechasse. He again served as commissioner of public works from 1852 to 1855, also representing the government on the board of directors of the Grand Trunk Railway. He was elected in both Bellechasse and Quebec City in 1854 and chose to represent Quebec City. In 1856, he resigned to accept an appointment as judge in the Quebec Superior Court at Montreal; he was transferred to Quebec City in 1857 where he died in 1860.

External links
 

1806 births
1860 deaths
Members of the Legislative Assembly of the Province of Canada from Canada East
Judges in Quebec
People from Chaudière-Appalaches